Henry Wall may refer to:

M. Henry Wall (1899–1970), Massachusetts politician, mayor of Lynn
Henry Arthur Wall, on List of mayors of Bristol, England for 1942
Henry Wall (cricketer) (1852–1914), English cricketer
Henry Wall (MP) (fl. 1390s), MP for Ipswich

See also
Henry Wahl (1915–1984), Norwegian speed skater
Harry Wall (disambiguation)